Bartho Ndubuisi Okolo, is a Professor of Microbiology who served as the 13th Vice Chancellor of the University of Nigeria, Nsukka.  He was preceded by Professor Osita Chinedu Nebo and succeeded by Professor Benjamin Chukwuma Ozumba. In 2014, he was probed by the Economic and Financial Crimes Commission for misuse of funds.

References

Living people
Academic staff of the University of Nigeria
Nigerian microbiologists
Year of birth missing (living people)
Vice-Chancellors of the University of Nigeria